Daniel Klem Jr. is an American ornithologist, known for his pioneering research into the mortality of birds due to glass windows. He is a Sarkis Acopian Professor of Ornithology and Conservation Biology at Muhlenberg College. He has been teaching there since 1979.  

Klem obtained his BSc at Wilkes University and his MSc at Hofstra University. He served in the US military served during the Vietnam War, and was awarded the Bronze Star Medal. He subsequently obtained his doctorate from Southern Illinois University.

In his 1990 papers "Bird injuries, cause of death, and recuperation from collisions with windows" and "Collisions between birds and windows: mortality and prevention", he calculated that between 100 million and 1 billion birds are killed, annually, in the United States alone, by flying into windows.

His research has influenced the design of buildings, not least the Niagara Falls State Park Observation Tower, on which he was a design consultant. He holds several US patents relating to windows design. He has also written about the birds of Armenia.

He received an honorary doctorate from Wilkes University, where he is also a trustee.

Bibliography

Papers 

  Klem, D., Jr. (2009). Avian mortality at windows: The second largest human source of bird mortality on earth. In Tundra to Tropics: Proceedings of the Fourth International Partners in Flight Conference (T. D. Rich, C. Arizmendi, D. Demarest, and C. Thompson, Editors). Partners in Flight, pp. 244–251.
 
  Klem, D., Jr. (2006). Glass: A deadly conservation issue for birds. Bird Observer 34:73–81. 
 
 
 
  Klem, D., Jr. (1989). Bird–window collisions. The Wilson Bulletin 101:606–620.
  Klem, D., Jr. (1979). Biology of collisions between birds and windows. Ph.D. dissertation, Southern Illinois University, Carbondale, IL, USA.

References

External links 

 
 Klem's papers at CrossRef
 Windows: A Clear Danger to Birds NPR radio programme featuring Klem

Living people
American ornithologists
Wilkes University alumni
Muhlenberg College faculty
Hofstra University alumni
Year of birth missing (living people)